The Wesley Willis Fiasco was an American punk rock band based in Wicker Park, Chicago, Illinois, United States, led by Wesley Willis.

History
The band was formed by Wesley Willis on vocals, Pat Barnard on lead guitar, and his friend Dale Meiners on guitar and bass. Dale Meiners previously played guitar in Billy Corgan's pre-Smashing Pumpkins band, the Marked. In 1992 Willis began writing songs, and soon after, Meiners took Willis into his studio to record them. After many drummer changes, Meiners, Barnard and Willis formed the Wesley Willis Fiasco with Dave Nooks on bass and Brendan Murphy on drums.  Their name was coined by early second guitarist Michael Cates.

They released only one studio album in 1996, Spookydisharmoniousconflicthellride (a reference to Willis's description of his schizophrenic episodes), which is found on the Urban Legend label. Various live albums are available, though most are bootlegs. After the band broke up, Willis continued to record his own solo albums. One of his songs on his solo album "Rock 'n' Roll Will Never Die" is about the Fiasco.

The Fiasco band covered the song "Girls on Film" by Duran Duran, which appeared on the Duran Duran Tribute Album in 1997. They also released a much sought after and hard to find 7" vinyl split with Sublime, as well as a split with Milwaukee's The Frogs.

The Fiasco toured with many bands, most notably Rocket from the Crypt, Sublime, and Lordz of Brooklyn. The band was also noted for charming Eddie Vedder, lead singer of Pearl Jam.

Due to conflicts between the Fiasco band's shows and Willis's solo keyboard shows, the band broke up while on tour in Ohio in 1996. Willis stated that the demons in his head worsened, causing him to constantly yell at the band unintentionally.

After the breakup, Pat Barnard sold his equipment and moved to Lake Tahoe, where he died in a drowning accident at the age of 27. Murphy, who briefly played with The Jesus Lizard, lives in Chicago, working for an indie label. Dale Meiners builds custom furniture. Dave Nooks got married and was a member of the Chicago-based punk and roll band The Symptoms for a time. Willis continued his solo career until his death from leukemia in 2003, age 40.

Band members
Wesley Willis (deceased) - vocals
Dale Meiners - guitar, bass guitar
Pat Barnard (deceased) - guitar
Dave Nooks - bass guitar
Brendan Murphy - drums

Discography
 1996 Spookydisharmoniousconflicthellride (Studio LP)
 1996 The Frogs do Wesley Willis/Wesley Willis Does the Frogs (with the Frogs) (EP)
 1997 Split 7" with Sublime (EP)
 2001 Live EP (Live EP)

References

1991 establishments in Illinois
1996 disestablishments in Illinois
Alternative rock groups from Illinois
Punk rock groups from Illinois
Hardcore punk groups from Illinois
Indie rock musical groups from Illinois
Musical groups disestablished in 1996
Musical groups established in 1991
Musical groups from Chicago
Sympathy for the Record Industry artists